The Castle of Riba de Santiuste (Spanish: Castillo de Riba de Santiuste) is a castle located in Sigüenza, Spain. It was declared Bien de Interés Cultural in 1992.
The castle was rebuilt twice: in 15th century for the first time and in 19th century after it had been partially destroyed.

References 

Bien de Interés Cultural landmarks in the Province of Guadalajara
Castles in Castilla–La Mancha
Buildings and structures in Sigüenza